Boophis andreonei is a species of frog in the family Mantellidae.
It is endemic to Madagascar.
Its natural habitats are subtropical or tropical moist lowland forests and rivers.
It is threatened by habitat loss.

References

andreonei
Amphibians described in 1994
Endemic frogs of Madagascar
Taxonomy articles created by Polbot